Park Joon-Gang (born 6 June 1991) is a South Korean footballer who plays as a right back for Gwangju FC.

Career
Park was selected by Busan IPark in the K League draft. He scored his first goal for the club against Gyeongnam FC on 3 August. Park established himself as IPark's first choice right back in the 2013 season, but injuries and the form of Yoo Ji-no restricted his appearances over the following two years.

Park completed his mandatory military service with army team Sangju Sangmu, joining the club in 2016, but the presence of international right-back Kim Tae-hwan restricted him to 16 appearances over two seasons. At the completion of his military service, Park returned to Busan IPark in 2018.

Following Busan's relegation to the K League 2 at the close of the 2020 season, Park joined Gwangju FC.

Club career statistics
As of 8 November 2020

References

External links 

1991 births
Living people
Association football fullbacks
South Korean footballers
Busan IPark players
Gimcheon Sangmu FC players
K League 1 players
Sangji University alumni